Hadrianopolis or Hadrianoupolis, also known as Hadriani, was a town in ancient Pisidia.

Its site is located near Eğnes in Asiatic Turkey.

References

Populated places in Pisidia
Former populated places in Turkey
Hadrian
History of Burdur Province